William F. (Scot) McCauley (June 23, 1931 – April 18, 2019) was a vice admiral and Surface Warfare Officer in the United States Navy. He graduated from the United States Naval Academy in 1955. McCauley retired from active duty in the Navy in 1988. In later life, he wrote three published novels.

His 1966 Ph.D. dissertation at the University of Nebraska was entitled Defense Procurement and Contracting: An Analysis of Management Changes and Impacts on the Defense Industry.

References

1931 births
2019 deaths
United States Naval Academy alumni
University of Nebraska–Lincoln alumni
United States Navy admirals
McCauley, Scot